An Elementary Treatise on Electricity is a posthumously published treatise on electricity by James Clerk Maxwell that was edited by William Garnett. The book was published in 1881 by Oxford University Press two years after Maxwell died in 1879. The editor's note at the beginning of the book states that most of the book's content was written about five years prior to Maxwell's death, some of which was used in the lectures Maxwell gave on electricity to members of the Cavendish Laboratory.

Publication history

References

Further reading
 
 

1881 non-fiction books
1888 non-fiction books
Physics books
1881 in science
1888 in science
Works by James Clerk Maxwell
Treatises